The Roman Catholic Diocese of San Miguel is a suffragan diocese of the Buenos Aires.  It was established by Pope Paul VI on 11 July 1978.

Bishops

Ordinaries
Horacio Alberto Bózzoli (1978–1983), appointed Archbishop of Tucumán
José Manuel Lorenzo (1983–1994) 
Abelardo Francisco Silva (1994–2000) 
José Luis Mollaghan (2000–2005), appointed Archbishop of Rosario
Sergio Alfredo Fenoy (2006–2018), appointed Archbishop of Santa Fe de la Vera Cruz
Damián Nannini (2018–present)

Coadjutor bishop
Abelardo Francisco Silva (1994)

Other priest of this diocese who became bishop
Nicolás Baisi, appointed Auxiliary Bishop of La Plata in 2010

References

 Catholic Hierarchy

San Miguel
San Miguel
San Miguel
San Miguel